Chris Impellitteri (born September 25, 1964) is the American lead guitarist and founder of the heavy metal band Impellitteri. Impellitteri is heralded as one of the greatest guitar shredders. He has won Best Rock Guitarist awards on several magazines during the years for his guitar soloing. 

In 2003, Guitar One Magazine voted Chris Impellitteri the second-fastest guitar shredder of all time, behind only Michael Angelo Batio; Yngwie Malmsteen was dubbed the third fastest shredder. In 2008, Guitar World magazine named him as one of the fastest guitarists of all time.

Biography 
On The Blairing Out Show, he said that both his parents committed suicide when he was nine years old, and that the guitar provided a path for him to express his anger and feelings.
Impellitteri's first music release was a black EP titled Impellitteri. It was filled with music featuring shredding guitar solos, screaming vocals, and a fast rhythm section. The Impellitteri Black EP established the band's sound in the metal world and was well received by their fans, critics, and respected musicians. Chris Impellitteri  was instantly branded a guitar hero after this recording was released. The following IMPELLITTERI record was titled Stand in Line and propelled the band into stardom. The music video Stand in Line was played often on MTV and VH1. The Stand in Line album featured Lead vocalist Graham Bonnet who formerly sang with the legendary rock band Rainbow.  IMPELLITTERI has recently released two new critically acclaimed records titled Venom and The Nature of the Beast. The band IMPELLITTERI currently features Rob Rock on vocals, James Pulli on Bass and Jon Dette on drums. The band has become very popular globally and has performed to over 30,000:people at a single show.

Equipment 
Over the course of his career, Impelliterri has used a wide variety of different guitar brands and models, including Fender, Gibson, and Dean.  He is currently endorsed by Charvel guitars with whom he has a custom model.  In addition, he also used ENGL amplifiers and Seymour Duncan pickups. Chris Impellitteri is currently using Charvel and Gibson guitars and Vintage Marshall and Mesa Boogie amplification.

Discography

with Impellitteri 
See: Impellitteri Discography
Stand in Line (1988)
Grin and Bear It (1992)
Answer to the Master (1994)
Screaming Symphony (1996)
Eye of the Hurricane (1997)
Crunch (2000)
System X (2002)
Pedal to the Metal (2004)
Wicked Maiden (2009)
Venom (2015)
The Nature of the Beast (2018)

with Animetal USA 
Animetal USA (2011)
Animetal USA W (2012)

Guest appearances 
 House of Lords – Sahara (1990)
 Various artists – Dragon Attack: A Tribute to Queen (1997)
 Various artists – Randy Rhoads Tribute (2000)

References 

Living people
Lead guitarists
American heavy metal guitarists
American people of Italian descent
1964 births
American male guitarists
Impellitteri members
20th-century American guitarists
20th-century American male musicians
Animetal USA members